The Ambassador Extraordinary and Plenipotentiary of the Russian Federation to the Republic of Korea is the official representative of the President and the Government of the Russian Federation to the President and the Government of South Korea.

The ambassador and his staff work at large in the Embassy of Russia in Seoul. There is a consulate general in Busan.

History of diplomatic relations

The Russian Empire established relations with the Joseon Dynasty in 1884. However Korea was deprived of its right to conduct independent foreign policy by the Japan-Korea Treaty of 1905, while the Union of Soviet Socialist Republics (the eventual successor to the Russian Empire) did not formally recognise the Provisional Government of the Republic of Korea in exile. In 1948, three years after the end of Japanese rule in Korea, the USSR recognised only one government on the Korean peninsula—the Democratic People's Republic of Korea, commonly North Korea. In September 1990, towards the end of its existence, the USSR established relations with the Republic of Korea (commonly known as South Korea).

List of heads of mission

Ministers of the Russian Empire to the Joseon Dynasty
 Karl Ivanovich Weber, appointed 14 October 1885

Ministers of the Russian Empire to the Korean Empire
 Karl Ivanovich Weber (as above)
 Alexey Shpeyer, appointed 28 March 1898
 Paul Pavlov, appointed 13 December 1898.

Ambassadors of the Soviet Union to the Republic of Korea

Ambassadors of the Russian Federation to the Republic of Korea

See also
 Russia-Korea Treaty of 1884
 List of diplomatic missions in South Korea
 List of ambassadors of Russia to North Korea

Notes

References
 Halleck, Henry Wager. (1861).  International law: or, Rules regulating the intercourse of states in peace and war New York: D. Van Nostrand. OCLC 852699
 Kim, Chun-gil. (2005). The History of Korea. Westport, Connecticut: Greenwood Press. ; ;  OCLC 217866287
 Korean Mission to the Conference on the Limitation of Armament, Washington, D.C., 1921-1922. (1922). Korea's Appeal to the Conference on Limitation of Armament. Washington: U.S. Government Printing Office. OCLC 12923609
 Seung-Ho Joo and Tae-Hwan Kwak. (2001). Korea in the 21st Century. Huntington, N.Y.: Nova Science Publishers. ;  OCLC 47200831
 Warner, Denis Ashton and Peggy Warner. (1974). The Tide at Sunrise: a History of the Russo-Japanese War, 1904-1905. New York: Charterhouse. OCLC 422325975

South Korea

Russia